Klop or KLOP may refer to:

People with the surname 
Kees Klop, Dutch professor of political ethics
Dirk Klop a Dutch army intelligence officer 
Jan Willem Klop, Dutch mathematician

Other uses 
 KLOP, a U.S. radio station
Mölkky, a Scandinavian lawn game also marketed in English as "Klop"

See also 
 Clop (disambiguation)
 Klopp